Craufurdland Castle is a rebuilt tower house, originating in the 16th century, about  north east of Kilmarnock, East Ayrshire, Scotland, north of the Craufurdland Water.

History
The property belonged to the Crawfords from the 13th century.  John Crawford of Craufurdland was killed at the battle of Flodden in 1513.  The castle was built in the 16th century, remodelled and extended in the 17th century, and further extended in the 18th and 19th centuries.  Ownership passed to the Howiesons in 1793.
The house was restored in the 1980s, and it is still occupied.

Simon Houison Craufurd, 29th Laird of Craufurdland Castle holds the role of Washer of the Sovereign's Hands in Scotland.

Structure
A corbelled-out battlement at one end of the original tower remains, as part of the west wing. This is three storeys and an attic high.  There is a basement which is vaulted, but the interior of the tower has been greatly altered.  There is a fine plaster ceiling in the King’s Room dated 1668, incorporating the arms of the Stewarts.

The 17th-century east wing is two storeys high.
It is said that an underground passage connected the castle to Dean Castle, some miles away.
The castle was remodelled as a  crenellated mansion, in Gothic style.

See also
William Houison Craufurd
Castles in Great Britain and Ireland
List of castles in Scotland

References

Castles in East Ayrshire
Clan Crawford